There have been two baronetcies created for persons with the surname Dunlop, with both in the Baronetage of the United Kingdom. One creation is extant as of 2007.

The Dunlop Baronetcy, of Dunlop in the County of Ayr, was created in the Baronetage of the United Kingdom in 1838 for John Dunlop, Member of Parliament for Ayrshire from 1835 to 1839. The title became extinct on the death of the second Baronet in 1858.

The Dunlop Baronetcy, of Woodbourne in the County of Renfrew, was created in the Baronetage of the United Kingdom on 6 July 1916, for the Scottish businessman Thomas Dunlop. He was Lord Provost of Glasgow between 1914 and 1917.

Dunlop baronets, of Dunlop (1838)
Sir John Dunlop, 1st Baronet (1806–1839)
Sir James Dunlop, 2nd Baronet (1830–1858)

Dunlop baronets, of Woodbourne (1916)
Sir Thomas Dunlop, 1st Baronet (1855–1938)
Sir Thomas Dunlop, 2nd Baronet (1881–1963)
Sir Thomas Dunlop, 3rd Baronet (1912–1999)
Sir Thomas Dunlop, 4th Baronet (born 1951)

The heir apparent is Thomas Dunlop (born 1990), eldest son of the 4th Baronet.

Line of succession

  Sir Thomas Dunlop, 1st Baronet (1855–1938)
  Sir Thomas Dunlop, 2nd Baronet (1881–1963)
  Sir Thomas Dunlop, 3rd Baronet (1912–1999)
  Sir Thomas Dunlop, 4th Baronet (born 1951)
 (1) Thomas Dunlop (b. 1990)
 William Beckett Dunlop (1915–1970)
 (2) Anthony Charles Beckett Dunlop (b. 1948)
 (3) Michael William Beckett Dunlop (b. 1951)
 (4) John William Dunlop (b. 1981)
 (5) Stephen James Dunlop (b. 1983)
 (6) Alasdair Graham Dunlop (b. 1986)
 (7) Simon Speirs Beckett Dunlop (b. 1955)
 Robert Jack Dunlop (1891–1952)
 George Teacher Dunlop (1923–1992)
 (8) Nichloas George Teacher Dunlop (b. 1956)
 (9) Angus George Teacher Dunlop (b. 1979)
 Robert Jack Dunlop (1927–2018)
 (10) Robert Alastair Dunlop (b. 1951)
 (11) Robert Michael Dunlop (b. 1985)
 (12) Timothy Dixon Dunlop (b. 1953)
 (13) Ross Timothy Dunlop (b. 1983)
 (14) Brodie Kenneth Dunlop (b. c. 1985)
 (15) Gavin Craig Dunlop (b. 1989)
 (16) Finian Dixon Dunlop (b. 2012)
 (17)  Andrew James Dunlop, Baron Dunlop (b. 1959)

References

Kidd, Charles, Williamson, David (editors). Debrett's Peerage and Baronetage (1990 edition). New York: St Martin's Press, 1990.

Baronetcies in the Baronetage of the United Kingdom
Extinct baronetcies in the Baronetage of the United Kingdom